Jerzy Połomski (born Jerzy Pająk; 18 September 1933 – 14 November 2022) was a Polish pop singer and actor. He is widely considered among the most popular Polish music artists of the 1960s and 1970s.

Life and career 
Born in Radom, Pająk adopted the surname Połomski while he was still a student at the State Higher School of Theater in Warsaw. He started his career in 1957, both as a stage actor specialized in dramatic roles as well as a singer active in radio broadcasts; in 1958 he ranked second in a poll held by Polskie Radio about most popular Polish singers, and one year later he made his recording debut with the album Podwieczorek z piosenką. In 1961 he placed at the second place at the first edition of the Sopot International Song Festival. In the following years he got a string of hits, including "Bo z dziewczynami" (audience award at the 1973 Opole Song Festival), "Komu piosenka", "Daj" and "Cała sala śpiewa z nami", and toured in Eastern and Western Europe, USSR, USA and Cuba.

During his career Połomski received various honours, notably the Medal for Merit to Culture – Gloria Artis and a Golden Fryderyk Award for his career. Suffering from hearing problems, he officially retired in 2019. He died on 14 November 2022, at the age of 89.

See also
Music of Poland
List of Polish music artists

References

External links 
 
   
 
 

1933 births
2022 deaths 
People from Radom
Polish folk singers
Polish pop singers
Polish male singers
Polish LGBT singers
Recipients of the Gold Medal for Merit to Culture – Gloria Artis
Recipients of the Silver Medal for Merit to Culture – Gloria Artis 
Aleksander Zelwerowicz National Academy of Dramatic Art in Warsaw alumni